The Te Hoe River is a river of the Hawke's Bay region of New Zealand's North Island. It flows south from its sources west of Lake Waikaremoana to reach the Mohaka River 20 kilometres north of Lake Tutira.

The river and its tributary streams flow through the Tahora Formation, and is a location where many Mesozoic fossils have been uncovered since the 1970s. In 1999, palaeontologist Joan Wiffen discovered the vertebra bone of a titanosaur in a tributary of the Te Hoe River.

See also
List of rivers of New Zealand

References

Rivers of the Hawke's Bay Region
Rivers of New Zealand
Paleontological sites of New Zealand